Vladas Jonas Jakubėnas (Biržai, 1904-Chicago, 1976) was a Lithuanian composer, pianist, musicologist and journalist.

Works, editions and recordings
 Chamber Music: Kasparas Uinskas, Rusne Mataityte, Edmundas Kulikauskas, Albina Siksniute, Vilnius String Quartet, St Christopher Chamber Orchestra, Donatas Katkus Toccata Classics 2011

References

1904 births
1976 deaths
Lithuanian composers
Lithuanian musicologists
Lithuanian classical pianists
Lithuanian journalists
People from Biržai
20th-century classical pianists
20th-century classical musicians
20th-century composers
20th-century musicologists
Lithuanian emigrants to the United States
20th-century journalists